"Can't Get Enough" is the debut single by English rock supergroup Bad Company.  Appearing on the band's 1974 self-titled debut album, it is their biggest hit and is considered their most popular song. It reached No. 5 on the Billboard Hot 100 singles chart and No. 1 on Cashbox magazine's Top 100 Singles chart. The song is also frequently played on classic rock radio stations.

Composition
The song is credited to guitarist Mick Ralphs, who tuned his guitar in the open-C tuning C-C-G-C-E-C. Ralphs stated that "It never really sounds right in standard tuning.  It needs the open C to have that ring."  It borrows from the riff Ralphs used for his 1972 Mott the Hoople song, "One of the Boys".

Reception
Billboard described "Can't Get Enough" as a "good, solid rocker" and praised Paul Rodgers' vocal performance.  Cash Box called it "one of the best rockers to come out of Britain in years," describing it as "Top 40 oriented with a heavier flair." Record World said that "lead singer Paul Rodgers is just enough of a controlled powerhouse to turn this into a solid top 40 item."

Classic Rock critic Malcolm Dome rated it as Bad Company's 2nd best song, saying that it "combines a shuffling riff with a classy melody, all done with a big production that still sounds intimate."  Classic Rock History critic Janey Roberts rated it as Bad Company's 3rd best song, saying that "the three chord progression to 'Can’t Get Enough' became a favorite of young guitar players growing up in the 1970s."  Ultimate Classic Rock critic Matt Wardlaw rated it as Bad Company's 5th best song, saying that the song "finds Paul Rodgers exuding complete confidence in his ability to land the girl that he wants."

Personnel
Paul Rodgers - vocals, rhythm guitar
Mick Ralphs - lead guitar
Boz Burrell - bass
Simon Kirke - drums

Track listing
7" vinyl

45 RPM

Chart positions

In popular culture
The song was made available to download on November 30, 2010 for use in the Rock Band 3 music gaming platform in both Basic rhythm, and PRO mode which allows use of a real guitar / bass guitar, and MIDI compatible electronic drum kits / keyboards in addition to vocals.
The song was performed by Lenny Henry and Tom Jones as part of Comic Relief
The song was featured in the 1993 sequel film Wayne's World 2. 
The song also features in the film "What the Bleep Do We Know!?" (2004).

References

1974 songs
1974 debut singles
Bad Company songs
Cashbox number-one singles
Songs written by Mick Ralphs
Swan Song Records singles
Island Records singles